Bhopal Express is a 1999 Hindi film directed by Mahesh Mathai. The film stars  Kay Kay Menon, Naseeruddin Shah, Nethra Raghuraman, Zeenat Aman and Vijay Raaz. The story was written by the advertising film maker Prasoon Pandey and his brother Piyush Pandey. The music was composed by the Shankar–Ehsaan–Loy trio.

Plot
Set against the gas tragedy in Bhopal, India, in 1984, this human drama examines the irresponsible methods of large corporations and the effects of their actions on common people. The night of the tragedy, poison gas clouds from the Union Carbide factory enveloped an arc of over 20 square kilometres killing over 8,000 people in its immediate aftermath and causing multi-systemic injuries to over 500,000 residents. Lest the neighbourhood community be "unduly alarmed", the siren in the factory had been switched off, adding to what would become an enduring disaster of immeasurable proportions. Adding insult to injury, researchers find that the future generations of the survivors will continue to suffer through chromosomal damage caused by the leak. The story unravels through the eyes of a newlywed couple and their friends as they try to pick up the pieces in the aftermath of the catastrophe.

Cast
 Kay Kay Menon - Verma
 Naseeruddin Shah - Bashir
 Nethra Raghuraman - Tara
 Zeenat Aman - Zohrabai
 Vijay Raaz - Badru
 Bert Thomas - David
 Dorinda Katz - American Girl
 Chris Sullivan - Maurice

Awards
The lead actress Nethra Raghuraman won the Star Screen Award for Most Promising Newcomer – Female for her part in the film.

Soundtrack

References

External links
 
 Bhopal Express: Cast and Crew details

1999 films
1999 in the environment
1990s Hindi-language films
Bhopal disaster
Indian disaster films
Films scored by Shankar–Ehsaan–Loy